Elena Andreea Panțuroiu (born 24 February 1995) is a Romanian athlete whose specialty is the triple jump. She participated in the 2015 World Championships in Beijing without qualifying for the final. She also sometimes competes in the long jump and combined events.

Her personal bests in the triple jump are 14.33 metres outdoors (+1.0 m/s, Pitesti 2016) and 14.33 metres indoors (Bucharest 2017).

Competition record

References

External links
 

1995 births
Living people
Romanian female triple jumpers
World Athletics Championships athletes for Romania
Sportspeople from Câmpulung
Athletes (track and field) at the 2016 Summer Olympics
Olympic athletes of Romania